Camp Branch Township is an inactive township in Cass County, in the U.S. state of Missouri.

Camp Branch Township was established in 1872, taking its name from Camp Branch creek.

References

Townships in Missouri
Townships in Cass County, Missouri